The M*A*S*H book series includes the original novel that inspired the  movie and then the TV series. The first, MASH: A Novel About Three Army Doctors, was co-authored by H. Richard Hornberger (himself a former military surgeon) and W. C. Heinz (a former World War II war correspondent); it was published in 1968 under the pen name Richard Hooker. It told the story of a U.S. Mobile Army Surgical Hospital in Korea during the Korean War. In 1972, Hornberger (writing again as Hooker) published the sequel M*A*S*H Goes to Maine, covering the lives of the surgeons after they returned home from the war.

After the success of the M*A*S*H TV series, a long series of "M*A*S*H Goes to __" novels appeared, beginning with M*A*S*H Goes to New Orleans in 1974. Although credited to Hooker and William E. Butterworth, they were essentially written by Butterworth alone. The sequel novels added many additional characters, mostly satiric caricatures of public figures from the 1970s:  for instance, operatic tenor Luciano Pavarotti is parodied in the form of a singer named "Korsky-Rimsakov", and news anchor Dan Rather becomes the egotistical "Don Rhotten".  The tone of the Butterworth novels is also markedly different from Hooker's original books, being much more broadly comical, less darkly satirical, and unrealistic.

After the conclusion of the "Butterworth" series with  M*A*S*H Goes to Montreal (1977), a final "Hooker" novel was published, M*A*S*H Mania, which ignored the events and inconsistencies of the intervening novels and picked up where M*A*S*H Goes to Maine left off, depicting the original characters in middle age.

Series

by Richard Hooker
MASH: A Novel About Three Army Doctors (1968)
M*A*S*H Goes to Maine (1972)
M*A*S*H Mania (1977)

by Richard Hooker and William E. Butterworth
M*A*S*H Goes to New Orleans (1974)
M*A*S*H Goes to Paris (1974)
M*A*S*H Goes to London (1975)
M*A*S*H Goes to Vienna (1976)
M*A*S*H Goes to San Francisco (1976)
M*A*S*H Goes to Morocco (1976)
M*A*S*H Goes to Miami (1976)
M*A*S*H Goes to Las Vegas (1976)
M*A*S*H Goes to Hollywood (1976)
M*A*S*H Goes to Texas (1977)
M*A*S*H Goes to Moscow (1977)
M*A*S*H Goes to Montreal (1977)

M*A*S*H
Black comedy books
Military humor
Novels set during the Korean War
Book series introduced in 1968